The Conference Carolinas women's basketball tournament is the annual conference women's basketball championship tournament for Conference Carolinas.

The tournament has been held annually since 1996. It is a single-elimination tournament and seeding is based on regular season records.

The winner receives Conference Carolina'a automatic bid to the NCAA Women's Division II Basketball Championship.

Results

Championship records

 Former CC members are highlighted in pink.
 Chowan, Converse, Erksine, North Greenville, and Southern Wesleyan have yet to reach the tournament final.
 Coker and St. Andrews never reached the tournament finals before departing the conference.

See also
 Conference Carolinas men's basketball tournament

References

NCAA Division II women's basketball conference tournaments
Tournament
Recurring sporting events established in 1996